Peder Eugen Lunde (25 May 1918 – 26 December 2009) was a Norwegian sailor and Olympic medalist. He was born in Nordstrand and represented the Royal Norwegian Yacht Club.

He received a silver medal in the 5.5 metre class with the boat Encore at the 1952 Summer Olympics in Helsinki, together with his wife Vibeke Lunde ("Babben") and Børre Falkum-Hansen.

References

External links
Peder Lunde's profile 

1918 births
2009 deaths
Norwegian male sailors (sport)
Olympic sailors of Norway
Olympic silver medalists for Norway
Olympic medalists in sailing
Sailors at the 1952 Summer Olympics – 5.5 Metre
Sailors at the 1956 Summer Olympics – 5.5 Metre
Medalists at the 1952 Summer Olympics